Ishak Belfodil (born 12 January 1992) is an Algerian footballer who plays as a striker for Qatari club Al-Gharafa and the Algeria national team.

A former France youth international, he was called up to the Algeria national team for the first time in August 2012.

Club career

Early career
Belfodil began his football career at OSC Elancourt, a club located in the western suburbs of Paris, and spent his formative years at the club. He later joined nearby club Trappes FC. While at Trappes, Belfodil passed the entrance tests required to attend the Clairefontaine academy, but was not selected following failure of the final test. As a result, he moved to Paris Saint-Germain spending only a year at the Camp des Loges, the club's training center. Belfodil attributed only one year there primarily due to not focusing on his studies and not receiving enough playing time with his youth section. In 2004, he joined AC Boulogne Billencourt, a sports club that also trained international players Hatem Ben Arfa and Issiar Dia. In 2007, Belfodil secured a move to Ligue 2 club Clermont Foot.

Belfodil spent only a year at Clermont and, while playing with the club under-16 team, scored nine of the team's first 15 goals in the Championnat National under-16 league becoming the top scorer of the league. His play sparked the interest of several clubs, most notably French club Lyon and English clubs Chelsea and Manchester United. On 13 November 2008, Lyon announced that they had acquired Belfodil and he had signed an aspirant (youth) contract with the club until June 2011.

Lyon
For the duration of the 2008–09 season, Belfodil played on the club's under-18 team. He was a member of the team that reached the 2008–09 Coupe Gambardella semi-finals appearing in six matches scoring two goals. Belfodil also made one appearance on the club's Championnat de France amateur team. In just the third week of the 2009–10 season, he was called up to the senior team for the club's match against Auxerre on 22 August and made his debut in that match coming on as a substitute for Jean-Alain Boumsong in the 85th minute. Lyon won the match 3–0. Belfodil made his UEFA Champions League debut three days later, in the second leg of the club's playoff round match against Anderlecht appearing as a substitute in the 60th minute for Lisandro López. On 16 July 2010, he  signed his first professional contract agreeing to a three-year deal until 2014. Due to still having another year left on his aspirant (youth) contract, the contract took effect beginning 1 July 2011.

Parma
After spending six months on loan at Bologna from January to June 2012, Belfodil signed with Serie A club Parma on 30 June 2012 for €2.5 million plus €600,000 bonuses and 20% profit of future transfer. He had a successful first season with Parma, where he scored eight Serie A goals playing as a striker and left winger.

Inter
On 5 July 2013, after long negotiations, Belfodil was announced as an Internazionale player. The transfer involved 50% of Belfodil's economic rights remaining with Parma, while he signed a five-year contract with Inter for a €5.75 million transfer fee. (50% of €11.5 million valuation) On 3 February 2014, FIFA also ruled that Lyon was eligible to receive €1.8 million due to the bonus clause. Belfodil was given the number 7 shirt at Inter. He was officially introduced as an Inter player on 16 July 2013 at the Paladolomiti in Pinzolo in the same press conference as Icardi.

On 22 July 2013, Belfodil scored his first goal for Inter in their 3–1 pre-season triumph over Vicenza; after his initial shot was saved by the goalkeeper, from the subsequent corner in the 42nd minute, Belfodil guided the ball into the net via a powerful header.

After making just eight league appearances in the first half of the 2013–14 Serie A season, all of them as a substitute, Belfodil joined fellow Serie A club Livorno on loan for the remainder of the season on 31 January 2014. At Livorno, Belfodil got a lot more playing time but his form was poor in a side that was ultimately relegated, failing to register a goal or assist in his time there.

Return to Parma
On 20 June 2014, Parma bought back 50% of Belfodil's contract from Inter so that the Crociati once again owned the entirety of the player's contract. The transfer fee was €5.75 million, despite in a cashless player swaps that involved Lorenzo Crisetig (€4.75 million) and Yao Eloge Koffi (for €1 million). After an ongoing financial crisis of the club which Parma and its intermediate holding company were declared bankrupted in the mid-season, Belfodil terminated his contract with Parma on 6 May 2015, which he waived the club the liability for the unpaid wages, despite the club also suffered from the write-down of the residual value of Belfodil's contract for about €8.25 million.

Baniyas
On 28 July 2015, Belfodil has officially joined Baniyas Club, signing a two-year contract with the UAE Arabian Gulf League side.

Standard Liège
On 31 August 2016, Belfodil signed a one-year contract with Belgian club Standard Liège, with an option to extend for another year.

Werder Bremen (loan)
On 31 August 2017, the last day of the German summer transfer window, he joined Bundesliga side Werder Bremen on a one-year loan, reportedly for a loan fee of €600,000. Werder Bremen secured an option to sign him permanently, reportedly for a transfer fee of €6.5 million, with sporting director Frank Baumann stating it is in the "single-digit million" range.

Hoffenheim

In May 2018, it was announced that Belfodil would join 1899 Hoffenheim for the 2018–19 season having signed a contract until 2022 with the club. The transfer fee paid to Standard Liège was reported as €5.5 million.

On 9 February 2019 he scored back to back 2 goals in a stunning comeback against Dortmund in Bundesliga. Hoffenheim were lagging behind by 0-3, then he scored the first goal in 75 th and the equaliser in 87 th minute to complete the comeback.

Al-Gharafa
On 21 August 2022, Belfodil signed a two-year contract with Al-Gharafa in Qatar.

International career
Belfodil is eligible for both France and Algeria. As a youth, he considered Algeria as he was ineligible to represent France as he had not received a passport. Belfodil asked his father to inform Algeria of his intention to play for them; however, his inquiries went unnoticed. Following his move to Lyon, the Algerian Football Federation sent an invitation, but Belfodil informed them that it was too late. In 2009, Belfodil was awarded his French passport and was subsequently called up to the under-17 team to participate in the 2009 UEFA European Under-17 Football Championship. He appeared in all three of the team's matches as they suffered group stage elimination.

Belfodil returned to international duty for the 2009–10 season under coach Philippe Bergeroo with the under-18 team. He made his debut for the team on 27 October 2009 in a friendly match against Denmark. On 8 December, he scored his first international youth goal in a 1–1 draw against the Ukraine. In 2010, he finished the campaign by scored against Germany at the Cloppenburg Arena in another 1–1 draw. Belfodil remained a cog in the team under coach Bergeroo for under-19 team duty. On 12 September 2010, he scored his first goal with the team in a 2–2 draw with Brazil in the 2010 edition of the Sendai Cup. In first round qualification for the 2011 UEFA European Under-19 Football Championship, he scored the only goal in the team's final group stage match win over Austria.

On 25 August 2012, Belfodil was called up by Vahid Halilhodžić to the Algeria national team for the first time for the 2013 Africa Cup of Nations qualifier against Libya. However, FIFA had not yet processed his allegiance switch to Algeria and his club refused to release him for the game. He was replaced by Mohamed Seguer. On 26 September 2012, FIFA announced that Belfodil's application was processed and he was eligible to represent Algeria.

Career statistics

Club

International
Scores and results list Algeria's goal tally first, score column indicates score after each Belfodil goal.

References

External links
 
 
 
 
 
 
 

1992 births
People from Mostaganem
Naturalized citizens of France
Living people
Association football forwards
Algerian footballers
Algeria international footballers
French footballers
France youth international footballers
Algerian expatriate footballers
French expatriate footballers
Algerian emigrants to France
Olympique Lyonnais players
Bologna F.C. 1909 players
Parma Calcio 1913 players
Inter Milan players
U.S. Livorno 1915 players
Baniyas Club players
Standard Liège players
SV Werder Bremen players
TSG 1899 Hoffenheim players
Hertha BSC players
Al-Gharafa SC players
Ligue 1 players
Serie A players
Bundesliga players
UAE Pro League players
Belgian Pro League players
2015 Africa Cup of Nations players
Expatriate footballers in Italy
Algerian expatriate sportspeople in Italy
French expatriate sportspeople in Italy
Expatriate footballers in the United Arab Emirates
Algerian expatriate sportspeople in the United Arab Emirates
French expatriate sportspeople in the United Arab Emirates
Expatriate footballers in Belgium
Algerian expatriate sportspeople in Belgium
French expatriate sportspeople in Belgium
Expatriate footballers in Germany
Algerian expatriate sportspeople in Germany
French expatriate sportspeople in Germany
Expatriate footballers in Qatar
Algerian expatriate sportspeople in Qatar
French expatriate sportspeople in Qatar